The 2022 Iowa State Cyclones football team represented Iowa State University in the 2022 NCAA Division I FBS football season. The Cyclones played their home games at Jack Trice Stadium in Ames, Iowa, and competed in the Big 12 Conference. They were led by seventh-year head coach Matt Campbell.

Previous season 
The 2021 Cyclones team finished the season 7-6, 5-4 in Big 12 play. The Cyclones were ranked as high as #7. Despite pre-season hype, the Cyclones underperformed throughout the season. Iowa State received an invitation to the Cheez-it Bowl where they were defeated by Clemson, 20-13. 

Several Cyclones entered the NFL after the 2021 season, including 2x first-team all-Big 12, 2x Big 12 Offensive Player of the Year running back Breece Hall was selected in the second round by the New York Jets. First-team all-Big 12 defensive end Eyioma Uwazurike was selected in the fourth round by the Denver Broncos. The William V. Campbell Trophy winner, Football Academic All-America of the Year award, and 3x first-team all-Big 12 tight end Charlie Kolar was selected in the fourth round by the Baltimore Ravens. 2x First-team all-Big 12 quarterback Brock Purdy was selected in the seventh round by the San Francisco 49ers.

Preseason

Big 12 media poll
The preseason poll was released on July 7, 2022.

Award watch lists
Listed in the order that they were released

Preseason Big-12 awards 
2022 Preseason All-Big 12 teams

Source:

Schedule
Iowa State and the Big 12 announced the 2022 football schedule on December 1, 2021.

Game summaries

vs. Southeast Missouri State Redhawks

at Iowa Hawkeyes

vs. Ohio Bobcats

vs. No. 17 Baylor Bears

at Kansas Jayhawks

vs. No. 20 Kansas State Wildcats

at No. 22 Texas Longhorns

vs. Oklahoma Sooners

vs. West Virginia Mountaineers

at Oklahoma State Cowboys

vs. Texas Tech Red Raiders

at TCU Horned Frogs

Personnel

Roster

Coaching staff

Rankings

Awards and honors

Players drafted into the NFL

TV ratings 

All totals via Sports Media Watch. Streaming numbers not included. † - Data not available.

References

Iowa State
Iowa State Cyclones football seasons
Iowa State Cyclones football